The 1896 college baseball season, play of college baseball in the United States began in the spring of 1896.  Play largely consisted of regional matchups, some organized by conferences, and ended in June.  No national championship event was held until 1947.

Conference changes and new programs
The Western Conference played its first season of baseball, with Chicago, Illinois, Michigan, and Wisconsin participating.
Central Michigan, Clemson, Indiana State, Kentucky, Marshall, UConn, and Wisconsin played their first varsity seasons.

Conference winners
This is a partial list of conference champions from the 1896 season.

Conference standings
The following is an incomplete list of conference standings:

References

1896 in American sports
1896 in baseball
College baseball seasons in the United States